William Leith (May 31, 1873 – July 16, 1940), nicknamed "Shady Bill", was an American professional baseball player who played in one game for the Washington Senators during the  season.

External links

Major League Baseball pitchers
Baseball players from New York (state)
Washington Senators (1891–1899) players
19th-century baseball players
1873 births
1940 deaths
Waterbury Rough Riders players
Lawrence Colts players